Welsh Athletics (WA) is the governing body for the sport of athletics in Wales. It was set up as a limited company in 2007, replacing the former Athletic Association of Wales. Welsh Athletics is part of UK Athletics, the national governing body for the sport in the United Kingdom.

Welsh Athletics currently has more than 100 affiliated clubs, and more than 11,000 athletes take part in WA competitions. 

Welsh Athletics also organises the ADC (Athletics Development Centre) programme: this programme aims at giving all athletes and coaches the best possible foundations to realise their potentials, and it is carried out in three indoor centres in Wales (in Cardiff, at the National Indoor Athletics Centre; Swansea and Deeside).

The headquarters are at Cardiff International Sports Stadium.

References

External links
 Official site
 Welsh Athletic Club Directory

Athletics
Athletics in Wales
Organisations based in Cardiff
2007 establishments in Wales
Organizations established in 2007